Xiushui Township (Wade-giles: Hsiushui) is a rural township in Changhua County, Taiwan.

Administrative divisions
The township comprises 14 villages: Antung, Anxi, Fuan, Heming, Jinling, Jinxing, Maxing, Pulun, Shanxi, Xialun, Xiushui, Yixing, Zengcuo, and Zhuangya.

Tourist attractions
 Yi Yuan Mansion

Notable natives
 Wang Huei-mei, Magistrate of Changhua County

External links

  Xiushui Government website

Townships in Changhua County